is a Japanese voice actress, singer and idol from Saitama Prefecture. She is a member of i☆Ris. Kubota is affiliated with 81 Produce and Avex Pictures.

Career 
Kubota attended a technical high school, and while there obtained a license to operate a forklift and to arc weld. As a senior in high school Kubota passed the Anisong vocal audition. In 2012 she and five other singers who had passed the audition formed the idol group i☆Ris and debuted in the same year. Her image color was orange. After graduating from high school she went on to university and continued her work as a voice actress and singer.

In 2013, she began voice acting in the anime Nyaruko: Crawling with Love. Her first major role was in 2014 as Sophy Hōjō in PriPara.

I☆Ris won the 10th annual Seiyu Award for singing in 2016.

In September 2017, Kubota was cast as Karin Asaka in the smartphone game Love Live School Idol Festival All Stars.

Filmography

Anime 
2013
 Nyaruko: Crawling with Love as store clerk
 Pretty Rhythm: Rainbow Live as Customer 5

2014 
 Battle Spirits: Saikyou Ginga Ultimate Zero as Samantha
 Dragon Collection as Tort
 Hamatora as Girl
 Pripara as Sophy Hōjō
 Robocar Poli as Betty

2015
 Urawa no Usagi-chan as Kojika Betsujo

2017
 Idol Time Pripara as Sophy Hōjō, Hana, and Powan
 Makeruna!! Aku no Guntan as Narrator for episode 2
 Kabukibu! as Tōko
 Black Clover as Sister Lily

2018
 Kiratto Pri Chan as Emo Moegi
 Magical Girl Site as Maimu Akane
 Gurazeni as Uguisu-jō
 Dropkick on my Devil! as Medusa

2019
 Grimms Notes The Animation as Shane, Alice
 Wise Man's Grandchild as Alice Corner
King of Prism: Shiny Seven Stars as God VII

2020
 Plunderer as Saki Ichinose
 Love Live! Nijigasaki High School Idol Club as Karin Asaka

2022
 Love Live! Nijigasaki High School Idol Club 2nd Season as Karin Asaka
 Musasino! as Kojika Bessho
 Shine Post as Itoha Karabayashi
 Aru Asa Dummy Head Mike ni Natteita Ore-kun no Jinsei as Toto Asakusa

2023
 In Another World with My Smartphone 2nd Season as Sakura

OVA 
Fantasy Star Stellara  (2014) as Ayumi Kido

Animated films 
 PriPara movies (4 from 2015 to 2017) as Sophy Hōjō
 King of Prism -Pride the Hero- (2017) as audience
 Pripara & Kiratto Pri Chan Kirakira Memorial live (2018) as Emo Moegi）

Video games

2013 
 Metal Max 4: Gekkō no Diva as Mikan

2014 
 OreTawā -Over Legend Endless Tower- as Scoop, Spana, and Asphalt cutter

2015 
 Uchi no Hime-sama wa Ichiban Kawaii as Harumachi-hime 
 MaidenCraft as Inori Tokitō
 Tokyo Harem as Erika Chihaya

2016 
 Grimms Notes as Shane

2017 
 SOUL REVERSE ZERO as Waltraute and Roßweiße
 Raramaji Honyarara MAGIC as Mai Suzaki

2018 
 Monster Musume Harem as Medusa

2019 
 Love Live! School Idol Festival as Karin Asaka
 Love Live School Idol Festival All Stars as Karin Asaka
 Grand Summoners as Shiki

2020 
 Digimon ReArise as Sara Shinkai

2022 

 Azur Lane as SN Arkhangelsk

Drama CD 
 38th Aimoto Girls High School Student Council Activity Journal Aipon (2014 - 2015)  as Satoko Kozora.
 Momo Kyun Sword Special CD "Peach" (2015) as Akebi
 Fureraji☆ (2016) as Aoi Aoyagi 
 In Another World With My Smartphone Drama CD 02 (2019) as Sakura

Radio 

 A&G Artist Zone i☆Ris's 2h (2013 - 2014) as a member of i☆Ris
 Radio Animage (2015-）
 Dive II Station NewGenerations! (2015)
 Fureraji☆Real Radio (2015-)
 NACK5 SPECIAL "VOICE ACTORS RADIO" (2016）

Television 
 Japacon★Wonderland (Narration, April 6, 2015 - September 19, 2016）
 Irakon (April 30, 2015-）

Stage 
 Pripara "Minna ni Todoke! Prism☆Voice! (February 4–7, 2016 at the Zepp Blue Theater, Roppongi) as Sophy Hōjō
 SOLID STAR Produce Vol.7 "Bright Funeral" (June 15–19, 2016 at the Haiyuza Theater) 
 Pripara "Minna ni Todoke! Prism☆Voice! 2017 (January 26–29, 2017 at the Zepp Blue Theater, Roppongi) as Sophy Hōjō
 KARATE MUSICAL「SAUCE」(July 6–13, 2017 at Zenrosai Hall /Space Zero)
Nazotoki wa Dinner no Ato de, a recitation (November 23–26; December 2–3, 2017, Imagine Studio)
 Shin☆Yuki no Princess (February 21–25, 2018, New National Theatre Tokyo)
 Jekyll vs Hyde, a musical recitation (March 20, 2018, Tokyo FM Hall) as Marie

References

External links 

81 Produce Profile
Miyu Kubota at Natalie

1995 births
Living people
Voice actresses from Saitama Prefecture
Japanese video game actresses
Japanese voice actresses
Japanese idols
81 Produce voice actors
Avex Group talents
Anime singers
21st-century Japanese actresses
21st-century Japanese singers
21st-century Japanese women singers
Iris (Japanese band) members
Nijigasaki High School Idol Club members